Armenia Airways is an Armenian carrier based at Zvartnots International Airport in Yerevan, Armenia. It was first founded in 2013 and started operations in late 2018. Currently, they own two Boeing 737s and are expecting two more aircraft.

History
Originally founded in 2013, Armenia Airways received its first aircraft in 2018. In 2018, Armenia Airways leased a Boeing 737-500 from Shirak Avia.

Destinations

Fleet
The Armenia Airways fleet consists of the following aircraft (as of December 2022):

See also
 List of airlines of Armenia
 List of airports in Armenia
 List of the busiest airports in Armenia
 Transport in Armenia

References

External links
 Facebook page

Airlines of Armenia
Airlines established in 2016
Armenian companies established in 2016
Transport in Yerevan